Keep On Doing is the third studio album by the folk trio the Roches, released in 1982 on Warner Bros. Records. It is their second collaboration with Robert Fripp, following their 1979 debut album.

Track listing

 "The Hallelujah Chorus" (George Frideric Handel)
 "Losing True" (Margaret Roche)
 "Steady with the Maestro" (George Gerdes)
 "The Largest Elizabeth in the World" (Terre Roche)
 "On the Road to Fairfax County" (David Massengill)
 "I Fell in Love" (Terre and Suzzy Roche)
 "The Scorpion Lament" (Margaret Roche)
 "Want Not Want Not" (Suzzy and Terre Roche)
 "Sex Is for Children" (Terre Roche)
 "Keep On Doing What You Do / Jerks on the Loose" (Suzzy and Terre Roche)

Personnel
 Recorded by Craig Leon. Assisted by Ken Tracht
 Recorded June, 1982 at Blue Rock Studios, New York City
 Maggie Roche –  acoustic guitar, synthesizer, piano, singing
 Terre Roche –  acoustic guitar, electric guitar, singing
 Suzzy Roche –  acoustic guitar, singing
 Tony Levin –  bass guitar
 Bill Bruford –  percussion
 Robert Fripp –  guitar and devices, on tracks 2, 9, and 10
 Tony Levin, Bill Bruford and Robert Fripp appear courtesy of E.G. Records
 Photography –  front cover –  Peter Cunningham
 Back cover –  Irene Young
 Front and Back cover –  Art Direction, Design –  Rise Daniels
 Special thanks to Teddy Wainwright, Elizabeth Rush, Glen Zdon, Loudon Wainwright III, Mark Johnson
 Management –  Michael Tannen and Associates
 Booking –  Elizabeth Rush, Tour Consultants Inc.

References 

1982 albums
The Roches albums
Warner Records albums
Albums produced by Robert Fripp